Sharada or Sarada (Sanskrit for "autumnal") may refer to:

 the season spanning the months of Bhadrapada, Ashvin, and Kārtika of the traditional lunar Hindu calendar
 Another name for the Hindu goddess Saraswati
 Sharada script, abugida writing system
 Sharada (Unicode block), a Unicode block of Sharada script characters

Geography
 Sarada River in Andhra Pradesh, India
 Sharda River, downstream renaming mainly in Uttar Pradesh of (Maha)Kali River on Nepal's western border with Uttarakhand, India
 Sharad Khola tributary to Babai River, Dang and Bardiya districts, Nepal

Films
 Sharada (1942 film), in Hindi
 Sharada (1957 film), in Hindi
 Sarada (1962 film), in Tamil
 Sharada (1973 film), in Telugu
 Sharada (1981 film), in Hindi
 Sarada (unreleased film), in Telugu

Literature
 Sarada (novel), an 1892 Malayalam novel
 Sharada (magazine), a Nepali literary magazine
 Sharada (Malayalam women's magazine), an Indian magazine in Malayalam language

People
 Sharada (born 1945), Indian actress
 Sarada Devi or Sarada Ma (1853–1920), wife and spiritual counterpart of Hindu mystic Ramakrishna Paramahamsa
 Nerella Sharada, Indian politician
 Princess Sharada Shah of Nepal (1943-2001), princess of Nepal
 Sharada Sharma, poet and writer

Other
 Sarada Uchiha (うちは サラダ), a main character in the manga and anime series Boruto: Naruto Next Generations
 Sharada Peeth, a temple in Sharda, Kashmir
 "Sharada", a song by Skye Sweetnam on her album Noise from the Basement
 Sarada (lizard), a genus of lizards

See also
 Sharda (disambiguation)
 
 

Hindu given names